Diesel Loco Shed, Abu Road is a motive power depot performing locomotive maintenance and repair facility for diesel locomotives of the Indian Railways, located at Abu Road railway station (ABR) in Abu Road city in the Indian state of  Rajasthan. It is one of the two diesel loco sheds of the North Western Railway, the others being at Bhagat ki Kothi.

History 
The diesel shed was commissioned on 26 October 1966. It was the biggest Metre Gauge diesel shed of Western Railway at that time with a holding of 112 YDM-4 Locomotives. With broad gauge conversion of Mahesana to Ajmer route, conversion of the shed to a broad gauge Shed with a holding of 60 locos was planned. The last mtre gauge locomotive was given a ceremonial send off on 15 February 1996.The first broad gauge locomotive of the shed was commissioned on 12 April 1997. Since then the holding rapidly increased to a full capacity of 60 locomotives by March 1998. The 60th locomotive was flagged off 9 March 1998.

WDG-3A locomotives were first commissioned & homed in 1998‐99. Work for augmentation of homing capacity of shed from 60 to 120 locomotive was completed in March 2003.

General information

Infrastructure

Locomotives

Operations 
Like all locomotive sheds, Abu Road does regular maintenance, overhaul and repair including painting and washing of locomotives. It not only attends to locomotives housed at Abu Road but also to ones coming in from other sheds as well. It has four pit lines for loco repair.

Locomotives of Abu Road shed along with Bhagat ki Kothi shed are the regular links for all trains running through Rajasthan. Abu Road locomotives used to be predominantly the regular links for trains traveling on the North Western Railway zone as well. As more and more railway lines were electrified, ABR started losing links to electric locomotives, mainly WAP1, WAP4, WAG7 and WAP7 locomotives from nearby electric locomotive sheds. 
The Shed maintains a passenger link of 50 locomotives, which includes among others the prestigious like the Yoga Express & Garib Rath Express, Jaisalmer–Jodhpur Express, Rajasthan Humsafar Express, Fast passengers trains and Link Express trains.

Livery and markings 
Indian Railways allows diesel loco sheds to paint their locomotives in their own unique liveries. Abu Road's locomotives have their current livery scheme painted in blue on the top and bottom with a wide white band around the middle. ing Images

References

External links 

ABUROAD
North Western Railway zone
1966 establishments in Rajasthan
Rail transport in Rajasthan